The Sunda blue flycatcher (Cyornis caerulatus), also known as the large-billed blue-flycatcher, is a species of bird in the family Muscicapidae. It is found in Sumatra and Borneo.
Its natural habitat is subtropical or tropical moist lowland forests.  It is threatened by habitat loss.

References

External links

Image at ADW

Cyornis
Birds of Sumatra
Birds of Borneo
Birds described in 1857
Taxa named by Charles Lucien Bonaparte
Taxonomy articles created by Polbot